The Ministry of Education (MOE or MoE) is a cabinet-level ministry in the government of Brunei which oversees education in the country. It was established immediately upon Brunei's independence on 1 January 1984. It is currently led by a minister and the incumbent is Romaizah Mohd Salleh who took office since 7 June 2022. The ministry is headquartered in Bandar Seri Begawan.

Budget 
In the fiscal year 2022–23, the ministry has been allocated a budget of B$583 million, a 23 percent decrease from the previous year.

Ministers

See also 
 Ministry of Education and Culture (Indonesia)
 Ministry of Education (Malaysia)
 Ministry of Education (Singapore)

Notes

References

External links
 

Education in Brunei
Brunei
Education